The chestnut weaver (Ploceus rubiginosus) is a species of bird in the family Ploceidae.
It is found in eastern and south-western Africa.

References

External links
 Chestnut weaver -  Species text in Weaver Watch.
 Chestnut weaver - Species text in The Atlas of Southern African Birds

chestnut weaver
Birds of East Africa
Birds of Southern Africa
chestnut weaver
Taxonomy articles created by Polbot